The 2015–16 Barnet F.C. season was the team's 128th year in existence, and their first back in League Two since the 2012–13 season, after gaining promotion in the 2014-15 season. Along with competing in League Two, the club also participated in the FA Cup, League Cup and Football League Trophy. The season covers the period from 1 July 2015 to 30 June 2016.

Squad statistics

Appearances and goals

Top scorers

Transfers

Transfers in

Loans in

Loans out

Transfers out

Competitions

Pre-season friendlies
On 29 May 2015, Barnet announced their first two pre-season friendlies against Peterborough United and Milton Keynes Dons. On 9 June 2015, Barnet added five more friendlies against Hungerford Town, St Albans City, Maidenhead United, Eastleigh and Northwood. A fixture against Crystal Palace was announced on 19 June 2015.

League Two

League table

Matches

August

September

October

November

December

January

February

March

April

May

FA Cup

League Cup
On 16 June 2015, the first round draw was made, Barnet were drawn away against Millwall. In the second round, Barnet drew Wolverhampton Wanderers away.

Football League Trophy
On 8 August 2015, live on Soccer AM the draw for the first round of the Football League Trophy was drawn by Toni Duggan and Alex Scott.

Middlesex Senior Cup
On the Middlesex FA website the second round details were announced, Barnet will face Staines Town.

References

Barnet
Barnet F.C. seasons